Weatherization (American English) or weatherproofing (British English) is the practice of protecting a building and its interior from the elements, particularly from sunlight, precipitation, and wind, and of modifying a building to reduce energy consumption and optimize energy efficiency.

Weatherization is distinct from building insulation, although building insulation requires weatherization for proper functioning.  Many types of insulation can be thought of as weatherization, because they block drafts or protect from cold winds. Whereas insulation primarily reduces conductive heat flow, weatherization primarily reduces convective heat flow.

In the United States, buildings use one third of all energy consumed and two thirds of all electricity. Due to the high energy usage, they are a major source of the pollution that causes urban air quality problems and pollutants that contribute to climate change. Building energy usage accounts for 49 percent of sulfur dioxide emissions, 25 percent of nitrous oxide emissions, and 10 percent of particulate emissions.

Procedures
Typical weatherization procedures include:
Sealing bypasses (cracks, gaps, holes), especially around doors, windows, pipes and wiring that penetrate the ceiling and floor, and other areas with high potential for heat loss, using caulk, foam sealant, weather-stripping, window film, door sweeps, electrical receptacle gaskets, and so on to reduce infiltration.
Sealing recessed lighting fixtures ('can lights' or 'high-hats'), which leak large amounts of air into unconditioned attic space.
Sealing air ducts, which can account for 20% of heat loss, using fiber-reinforced mastic (not duck/duct tape, which is not suitable for this purpose)
Installing/replacing dampers in exhaust ducts, to prevent outside air from entering the house when the exhaust fan or clothes dryer is not in use.
Protecting pipes from corrosion and freezing.
Installing footing drains, foundation waterproofing membranes, interior perimeter drains, sump pump, gutters, downspout extensions, downward-sloping grading, French drains, swales, and other techniques to protect a building from both surface water and ground water.
Providing proper ventilation to unconditioned spaces to protect a building from the effects of condensation. See Ventilation issues in houses
Installing roofing, building wrap, siding, flashing, skylights or solar tubes and making sure they are in good condition on an existing building.
Installing insulation in walls, floors, and ceilings, around ducts and pipes, around water heaters, and near the foundation and sill.
Installing storm doors and storm windows.
Replacing old drafty doors with tightly sealing, foam-core doors.
Retrofitting older windows with a stop or parting bead across the sill where it meets the sash.
Replacing older windows with low-energy, double-glazed windows.

The phrase "whole-house weatherization" extends the traditional definition of weatherization to include installation of modern, energy-saving heating and cooling equipment, or repair of old, inefficient equipment (furnaces, boilers, water heaters, programmable thermostats, air conditioners, and so on).  The "Whole-House" approach also looks at how the house performs as a system.

Air quality
Weatherization generally does not cause indoor air problems by adding new pollutants to the air. (There are a few exceptions, such as caulking, that can sometimes emit pollutants.) However, measures such as installing storm windows, weather stripping, caulking, and blown-in wall insulation can reduce the amount of outdoor air infiltrating into a home. Consequently, after weatherization, concentrations of indoor air pollutants from sources inside the home can increase.

Weatherization can have a negative impact on indoor air quality, especially among occupants with respiratory illnesses. This occurs because of a decrease in air exchange in the home, and resulting increase in moisture. This leads to higher concentrations of pollutants in the air.

US Weatherization Assistance Program

Weatherization has become increasingly high-profile as the cost of home heating has risen. The US Weatherization Assistance Program (WAP) was created within the US Department of Energy in 1976 to help low-income families reduce energy consumption and costs across all fifty states, the District of Columbia, including Native American tribes.

The US Department of Energy estimates weatherization returns $2.69 for each dollar spent on the program, realized in energy and non-energy benefits. Families whose homes are weatherized are expected to save $358 on their first year's utility bills.

Low Income Home Energy Assistance Programs in many states work side by side with WAP to provide both immediate and long term solutions to energy poverty.

See also
Building envelope
Building indoor environment
Building performance
Central heating
Heating, ventilation and air conditioning (HVAC)
Low-energy house
Vapor barrier
WikiBooks How-to guide to Weatherization

References

External links

Houston Advanced Research Center
The Weatherization Assistance Program (WAP) Technical Assistance Center (WAPTAC)
The WAP System for Identifying and Reviewing New Technologies and Techniques
Weatherization Information Portal
Home Energy Weatherization Articles
https://www.rhinoshieldwis.com/
http://rhinoshieldjax.com/ 

Thermodynamics
Heating, ventilation, and air conditioning
United States Department of Energy